Humility Garden is a novel by Felicity Savage published by ROC in 1995.

Plot summary
Humility Garden is a novel that is written in the form of an unfinished biography of the character Humility Garden.

Reception
Steve Faragher reviewed Humility Garden for Arcane magazine, rating it a 4 out of 10 overall. Faragher comments that "There is a lot to this book: an outline of a fascinating world, a lot of thoughtfulness and a desire to tackle large topics. Sadly, there is almost no enjoyment to complement that."

Reviews
Review by Faren Miller (1995) in Locus, #409 February 1995 
Review by Peter Heck (1995) in Asimov's Science Fiction, November 1995, (1995) 
Review by Tom Easton (1995) in Analog Science Fiction and Fact, September 1995, (1995) 
Review by Cavan Scott (1996) in SFX, July 1996 
Review by Paul Di Filippo (1997) in Asimov's Science Fiction, January 1997

References

1995 novels